Platycaryeae is a tribe of flowering plants in the family Juglandaceae, and comprising a single living genus Platycarya. The tribe is now native to eastern Asia in China, Korea, and Japan.

A series of fossil genera have been described from the Northern Hemisphere dating between the Early Eocene, and gradually becoming confined to East Asia during the Pleistocene ice ages.  The fossil record is dominated by morphotaxa based on plant material, with isolated fruit, foliage, leaves, pollen, and woods in segregate mophogenera.

Genera
Platycarya 
†Clarnoxylon (wood morphotaxon)
†Hooleya  (fruit morphotaxon)
†Palaeoplatycarya  (fruit morphotaxon)
†Platycarypollenites  (pollen morphotaxon)
†Pterocaryopsis  (fruit morphotaxon)
†Vinea  (leaf morphotaxon)

References 

Rosid tribes
Juglandoideae